Kandiah Navaratnam (born 2 January 1935) is a Sri Lankan Tamil politician and former Member of Parliament.

Navaratnam was born on 2 January 1935. He was educated at Jaffna Hindu College. He is a Hindu.

Navaratnam contested the 1989 parliamentary election as one of the Eelam People's Revolutionary Liberation Front's candidates in Jaffna District and was elected to Parliament.

References

1935 births
Alumni of Jaffna Hindu College
Eelam People's Revolutionary Liberation Front politicians
Living people
Members of the 9th Parliament of Sri Lanka
People from Northern Province, Sri Lanka
Sri Lankan Hindus
Sri Lankan Tamil politicians